Sticky Moments (also known as Sticky Moments with Julian Clary) is a British satirical television game show that was broadcast on Channel 4 between October 1989 and December 1990. It was hosted by the comedian Julian Clary.

Cast and crew
The series was devised and written by Clary with the fellow comedian and writer Paul Merton, and was produced by Clary's production company Wonderdog Productions (named after his beloved pet whippet mongrel "Fanny the Wonderdog", who also regularly appeared on the show).

Clary was accompanied by two co-hosts, his "steadfastly heterosexual" pianist, Russell Churney, who provided musical accompaniment and a foil for Clary's teasing, and announcer/scorekeeper/assistant "Hugh Jelly" (played by actor Philip Herbert) – a large man with a booming voice, usually dressed almost as flamboyantly as Clary himself. Hugh Jelly appeared from the second episode onwards, while Clary's assistant in the first episode was "Barbara Lomax" (played by Jane Janovic). Further musical accompaniment was provided by the duo Barb Jungr & Michael Parker, who assisted Clary when he performed a musical number at the end of each show.

Various celebrity guests made appearances, usually assisting in a game round, including Harry Enfield, Nicholas Parsons, Dora Bryan, Barbara Windsor, Fenella Fielding, Bill Oddie, The Beverley Sisters and Mike Smith (who had worked with Clary previously on the ITV comedy game show Trick or Treat and was a regular target of Clary's jokes).

Premise
Clary, in customary full make-up and dressed in a new outrageous outfit each week, selected contestants for the night's show from the audience members queuing outside. Once in the studio, contestants were introduced by him and were then subjected to some light-hearted teasing based on their personal details.

The questions, answers, challenges and cheap prizes were deliberately off-centre, and rife with gay innuendo and double entendres, played for laughs rather than actual competition.

Contestants were eliminated round-by-round, based on Clary's mostly arbitrary point allocation. Losing players were given a plaster bust of Fanny the Wonderdog as a consolation prize, with the eventual lucky winner receiving a prize of barely more value (wine/champagne, flowers, plastic tiara, etc.). At the end of each show, following a musical number by Clary and Co, the winner was then seen stepping into a chauffeur-driven car, whilst the runner-up was left to go home in less glamorous circumstances (bicycle, wheelbarrow, etc.).

The first series was a success and Channel 4 commissioned a second that followed in late 1990. The second series was officially titled Sticky Moments on Tour with Julian Clary, although the format was essentially identical to the first series with the addition of painted studio backdrops and props to humorously pretend the show was taking place in more exotic locations (France, Australia, Scotland, and an episode based at the less exotic Newport Pagnell).

Clary also performed a live version of Sticky Moments on his UK national stage tour in 1990, with contestants plucked from the audience.

Transmissions

Series

Special

References

External links
 
 
 Sticky Moments at BFI
 Sticky Moments on Tour at BFI
 

1989 British television series debuts
1990 British television series endings
Channel 4 comedy
1980s British game shows
1990s British game shows
British LGBT-related comedy television series